The Little Rock Trojans baseball team, is a varsity intercollegiate athletic team of the University of Arkansas at Little Rock in Little Rock, Arkansas, United States. The team is a member of the Ohio Valley Conference, which is part of the NCAA Division I. The team plays its home games at Gary Hogan Field in Little Rock, Arkansas.

On July 1, 2015, the Trojans officially announced they would no longer be branded as Arkansas–Little Rock or "UALR," but will be the Little Rock Trojans effective immediately.

Year-by-year results

References:

See also
List of NCAA Division I baseball programs

References

External links